The following NASCAR national series were sanctioned in 2013:

2013 NASCAR Sprint Cup Series – The top racing series in NASCAR
2013 NASCAR Nationwide Series – The second-highest racing series in NASCAR
2013 NASCAR Camping World Truck Series – The third-highest racing series in NASCAR

 
NASCAR seasons